Chilo pulverata is a moth in the family Crambidae. It was described by Wileman and South in 1917. It is found in Taiwan, Japan, China and the Philippines, as well as on Timor and Sumatra.

References

Chiloini
Moths described in 1917